Craspia is a genus of moths in the famil ly Lasiocampidae. The genus was erected by Per Olof Christopher Aurivillius in 1909.

Species
Craspia hypolispa Tams, 1930
Craspia igneotincta Aurivillius, 1909
Craspia kilwicola Strand, 1912
Craspia marshalli Aurivillius, 1908
Craspia rhypara Hering, 1928
Craspia wahlbergi Aurivillius, 1909
Craspia wellmanni Weymer, 1908

References

Lasiocampidae